Neoterebra biminiensis is a species of sea snail, a marine gastropod mollusk in the family Terebridae, the auger snails.

Description
Original description: "Shell slender, elongated, with straight-sided whorls; whorls with 21-25 narrow, rounded axial ribs; ribs slightly curved, being bent toward aperture near suture, and straight on main body of whorl; deeply impressed sulcus below suture, producing wide subsutural band; subsutural band intersected by axial ribs, producing beaded effect; body whorl, subsutural band and spire whorls covered by numerous, fine, raised spiral threads; aperture long and narrow, produced anteriorward; shell color uniform pale pinkish tan; interior of aperture rose-pink with tan overtones."

Etymology
"Named for the Bimini Chain of islands, the Bahamas, the type locality."

Distribution
Locus typicus: "Nixon's Harbour, South Bimini Island, 
Bimini Chain, Bahamas."

This marine species occurs off the Bahamas.

References

 Petuch E.J. (1987). New Caribbean Molluscan Faunas. Charlottesville, Virginia: The Coastal Education and Research Foundation. 154 pp., 29 pls; addendum 2 pp., 1 pl.

External links
 Fedosov, A. E.; Malcolm, G.; Terryn, Y.; Gorson, J.; Modica, M. V.; Holford, M.; Puillandre, N. (2020). Phylogenetic classification of the family Terebridae (Neogastropoda: Conoidea). Journal of Molluscan Studies

Terebridae
Gastropods described in 1987